Beckley is a surname. Notable people with the surname include:

Alfred Beckley (1802–1888), American politician and Confederate militia general
Art Beckley (1901–1965), American football player
Beatrice Beckley (1885–?), English-born actress
Bill Beckley (born 1946), American artist
Charlie Beckley (1885–1964), Australian rules footballer
Elizabeth Beckley (c. 1846 – 1927), British astronomical photographer
George Charles Beckley (1787–1826), English sailor, trader and military adviser
George Charles Moʻoheau Beckley (1849–1910), Hawaiian seafarer, grandson of George Charles Beckley and director of the Wilder Steamship Company
Gerry Beckley (born 1952), American musician
Jake Beckley (1867–1918), American baseball player
John J. Beckley (1757–1807), American political campaign manager and Librarian of Congress
Michael Beckley (born 1963), Australian actor
Michelle Beckley, American politician
Paul Beckley (1910–2008), American film critic
Philip Beckley (born 1936), British physicist and writer
Rob Beckley (born 1975), American musician
Tony Beckley (1929–1980), English actor
William Beckley (disambiguation), multiple people

Surnames
Toponymic surnames
Surnames of English origin
English-language surnames
Surnames of British Isles origin